The Rural Municipality of Eriksdale is a former rural municipality (RM) in the Canadian province of Manitoba. It was incorporated as a rural municipality on 22 March 1918. It ceased on 1 January 2015 as a result of its provincially mandated amalgamation with the RM of Siglunes to form the Municipality of West Interlake.

Communities 
 Deerhorn
 Eriksdale
 Scotch Bay

References

External links 
 Map of Eriksdale R.M. at Statcan
 Town of Eriksdale Homepage

Eriksdale
Populated places disestablished in 2015
2015 disestablishments in Manitoba